The Australian Script Centre has been selectively collecting, promoting and distributing contemporary Australian plays in manuscript form since 1979. It is recognised by the Australia Council for the Arts as a Key Organisation providing essential infrastructure services to the theatre sector. The Centre's work supports playwrights in particular by filling the gap left by the very small number of Australian plays that achieve commercial publication. Its ecommerce website, australianplays.org, gives playwrights a global distribution and marketing network for their work as well as giving producers everywhere a simple access point for professionally written and production-ready Australian plays.

The ASC is a non-profit association with a membership base comprising a diverse community of theatre makers, including many playwrights, drama educators, students, theatre companies and producers.

The Australian Script Centre is the only national arts organisation based in Tasmania. It grew out of an initiative of Barbara Manning and the Salamanca Theatre Company, called the Salamanca National Script Resource Centre. Initially the centre was a distribution service for playwrights writing for theatre-in-education. It ran successfully throughout the 1980s and in 1993 separated from the Salamanca Theatre Company to become the Australian Script Centre. The centre's collection rapidly grew as it began to incorporate all styles of play and radio scripts. It now houses the largest and most comprehensive collection of unpublished contemporary Australian playscripts in the world. This represents a significant cultural and historical resource.

References
 Australian Script Centre Website
 Australian Plays Website

Theatre in Australia